HMS Fortune was one of nine F-class destroyers built for the Royal Navy in the mid-1930s. Although she was assigned to the Home Fleet upon completion, the ship was detached to the Mediterranean Fleet to enforce the arms blockade imposed by Britain and France on both sides during the Spanish Civil War of 1936–39. Several weeks after the start of the Second World War in September 1939, Fortune helped to sink a German submarine. The ship escorted the larger ships of the fleet during the early stages of World War II and played a minor role in the Norwegian Campaign of 1940. Fortune was sent to Gibraltar in mid-1940 and formed part of Force H where she participated in the Battle of Dakar against the Vichy French. The ship escorted numerous convoys to Malta in 1940–41 until she was badly damaged by Italian bombers in mid-1941.

After repairs were completed, Fortune was briefly assigned to the Mediterranean Fleet before she was transferred to the Eastern Fleet in the Indian Ocean in early 1942. The ship screened an aircraft carrier during the Battle of Madagascar later that year and was assigned to convoy escort duties for the rest of 1942 and early 1943. She returned home in February to begin conversion into an escort destroyer. The ship was transferred to the Royal Canadian Navy (RCN) when it was completed in mid-1943 and renamed HMCS Saskatchewan. The ship spent the next year escorting convoys in the North Atlantic before she was transferred to the English Channel to defend convoys during the Normandy landings in June 1944. Saskatchewan engaged some German patrol boats the following month and was lightly damaged. She was sent to Canada for repairs and a general refit and did not return to the UK until January 1945. The ship resumed her former duties until the end of the war in May and then ferried troops back to Canada for several months. Saskatchewan was judged surplus later that year and was sold for scrap, in early 1946.

Description
The F-class ships were repeats of the preceding E class. They were powered by two Brown-Curtis geared steam turbines, each driving one propeller shaft, using steam provided by three Admiralty three-drum boilers. Fortune barely exceeded her designed speed during her sea trials. The ships' complement was 145 officers and ratings.

The ships mounted four 4.7-inch (120 mm) Mark IX guns in single mounts in single mounts, designated 'A', 'B', 'X', and 'Y' in sequence from front to rear. For anti-aircraft (AA) defence, they had two quadruple Mark I mounts for the 0.5 inch Vickers Mark III machine gun. The F class was fitted with two above-water quadruple torpedo tube mounts for  torpedoes. One depth charge rack and two throwers were fitted; 20 depth charges were originally carried, but this increased to 35 shortly after the war began.

Wartime modifications
Fortune had her rear torpedo tubes replaced by a 12-pounder (76 mm) AA gun by April 1941. In February–May 1943, she was converted into an escort destroyer. A Type 286 short-range surface search radar was fitted and a Type 271 target indication radar was installed above the bridge, replacing the director-control tower and rangefinder. The ship also received a HF/DF radio direction finder mounted on a pole mainmast. Her short-range AA armament was augmented by four  Oerlikon guns and the .50-calibre machine guns were replaced by a pair of Oerlikons. A split Hedgehog anti-submarine spigot mortar was installed abreast 'A' gun and stowage for a total of 70 depth charges meant that 'Y' gun, the 12-pounder and her Two-Speed Destroyer Sweep (TSDS) minesweeping gear had to be removed to compensate for their weight.

Construction and career
Fortune, the 23rd ship of that name in the Royal Navy, was laid down by John Brown & Company at their Clydebank shipyard on 27 July 1933. She was launched on 29 August 1934 and completed on 27 April 1935. The ship cost 247,564 pounds, excluding government-furnished equipment like the armament. Fortune was initially assigned to the 6th Destroyer Flotilla (DF) of the Home Fleet, but detached to the Mediterranean Fleet in 1937 to enforce the arms embargo imposed on both sides in the Spanish Civil War by the Non-Intervention Committee. The 6th DF was renumbered the 8th Destroyer Flotilla in April 1939, five months before the start of World War II.

After a pair of fishing trawlers were sunk by a submarine off the Hebrides after the start of World War II in September 1939, the 6th and 8th DFs were ordered to sweep the area on 19 September. In February 1940, she was one of the escorts for Convoy TC 3 carrying troops from Canada to the UK. In the following month, while escorting units of the Home Fleet north-west of Shetland on 20 March, she was credited with sinking , although later research suggests that the submarine was destroyed in a minefield which had been laid by other British destroyers on 13 March.

During the Norwegian Campaign, Fortune played a minor role escorting the oiler RFA War Pindari to Namsos on 15 April. On 25 April, she ferried part of the 2nd Battalion, the South Wales Borderers to Bogen and Lenvik. In early May, she escorted two cruisers ferrying troops to occupy Iceland. In August, Fortune was briefly transferred to the 4th DF and on 10 August, the ship rescued survivors from the torpedoed armed merchant cruiser Transylvania. Later in the month, she escorted a convoy to Gibraltar and was transferred to Force H on the 28th.

Force H, 1940–41
During Operation Hats, the ship escorted Force H while the carriers  and Ark Royal flew off fighter aircraft for Malta and conducted an airstrike on Cagliari on 2 August. On 13 September, Force H rendezvoused with a convoy that was carrying troops intended to capture Dakar from the Vichy French. In November, the ship escorted the carriers during Operations Coat and White as they flew off fighters for Malta and attacked the airfield at Elmas, Sardinia. During the former operation, Fortune was detached and escorted Force F to Malta, streaming her TSDS gear at the head of the convoy to serve as a fast minesweeper.

In early January 1941, she participated in Operation Excess. Three months later, Fortune and four other destroyers escorted the light cruiser , the battlecruiser , and Ark Royal in Operation Winch, which delivered a dozen Hurricane fighters to Malta. Beginning on 24 April, Fortune and Force H covered Argus flying off more Hurricanes as well as the destroyers of the 5th Destroyer Flotilla sailing to Malta in Operation Dunlop. This was part of Operation Tiger which included a supply convoy taking tanks to the Middle East and the transfer of warships. Fortune and her sisters had their TSDS gear deployed en route to Malta. Despite this, one merchant ship was sunk by mines and another damaged. During the return voyage on 10 May, the ship was badly damaged by a  bomb that detonated nearby. The shockwave ruptured the hull, knocked out her engines, slightly bent her propeller shafts, and caused a lot of flooding. Fortune then sailed to Chatham Royal Dockyard for permanent repairs that lasted until November.

Although she returned to Gibraltar that same month, the ship did not become fully operational and mechanical problems restricted her to local duties until February 1942. On the 9th of that month, Fortune escorted the light cruiser 
to Malta and then escorted her and a convoy including the transport  to Alexandria, Egypt where they arrived on the 17th. She was transferred to the 2nd DF of the Eastern Fleet and arrived at Trincomalee, Ceylon on 7 March. Admiral James Somerville, commander of the fleet, assigned her to screen the slow ships of Force B as he organised his forces in anticipation of the Japanese Indian Ocean Raid. On 4 April, the ship rescued 88 survivors from the torpedoed freighter . Fortune returned to the Mediterranean to participate in Operation Vigorous, a convoy from Alexandria to Malta, in June. After the ship returned to the Indian Ocean, she was assigned to the 12th DF and escorted the carrier  when that ship supported operations on Madagascar in September. Fortune spent the rest of the year and the first part of 1943 escorting convoys in the Indian Ocean until she was sent home in February for conversion into an escort destroyer.

HMCS Saskatchewan
Upon completion of the conversion, the ship was transferred to the RCN on 31 May, renamed Saskatchewan, and then gifted to Canada on 15 June 1943. She was assigned to Escort Group C3, of the Mid-Ocean Escort Force, as the "Senior Officer's" ship, which was based in Londonderry Port. The ship remained with the group until she was transferred to the 12th Escort Group in May 1944 where she later patrolled the western entrance to the English Channel after the Normandy landings to protect shipping from German attacks.

Together with the destroyers Qu'Appelle, Skeena, and Restigouche, Saskatchewan attacked three German patrol boats off Brest on the night of 5–6 July, with sinking the German patrol boat V715. Saskatchewan was lightly damaged and suffered one man dead and four wounded. The ship was sent to Canada for a refit and arrived at Halifax on 6 August. She began her refit at Shelburne, Nova Scotia which lasted until November. More work was required at St. John's, Newfoundland and Saskatchewan did not return to Britain until January 1945.

Upon her arrival, she was assigned first to the 14th Escort Group and then the 11th Escort Group. With the end of the war on 9 May, the ship ferried Canadian troops back home, arriving on 30 May. She made four voyages between St John's and Quebec City before being declared surplus on 23 September, although the ship was not paid off until 28 January 1946 at Sydney, Nova Scotia. Saskatchewan was sold later that year to the International Iron & Metal Co. for scrap.

Ship's bell
The ship's bell of Saskatchewan is currently at the Vancouver Island Military Museum in Nanaimo, British Columbia. The Christening Bells Project at Canadian Forces Base Esquimalt Naval and Military Museum includes information from the ship's bell of Saskatchewan, which was used for baptism of babies on board ship.

References

Bibliography

External links
 HMS Fortune / HMCS Saskatchewan on naval-history.net
 HMCS Saskatchewan (H70) – uboat.net
 River-class destroyers – hazegrey.org

 

E and F-class destroyers of the Royal Navy
Ships of the Royal Canadian Navy
Ships built on the River Clyde
1934 ships
World War II destroyers of the United Kingdom
Canadian River-class destroyers
Canadian River-class destroyers converted from E and F-class destroyers